Said Zaidi (born 10 January 1986 in Casablanca) is a Moroccan footballer, who is currently attached to Chabab Rif Al Hoceima.

External links
 Wydad Profile

Living people
1986 births
Moroccan footballers
Footballers from Casablanca
Wydad AC players
Chabab Rif Al Hoceima players
Association football defenders